Top Burmese is a small chain of restaurants serving Burmese cuisine in the Portland, Oregon metropolitan area, in the United States. Owners Kalvin and Poe Myint started the business in 2019. There are three locations in addition to the original restaurant on 21st Avenue in northwest Portland's Northwest District: Top Burmese Bistro Royale has operated in Beaverton since 2020, Top Burmese Burma Joy opened on 23rd Avenue in the Northwest District in 2021, and Top Burmese Ambassador opened in Hillsboro in 2022. Top Burmese branch off beyond Burmese Cuisine with Old Asia Bistro & Tea House slated to open in Beaverton in 2023.

Description and history

Original restaurant 
Top Burmese began as a "virtual restaurant" in early 2019, operating via delivery and take-out. Delivery platforms included DoorDash, Grubhub, Postmates, and Uber Eats, and order could also be picked up at the kitchen on 16th Avenue in northwest Portland's Northwest District. The first Top Burmese restaurant has operated on 21st Avenue in the Northwest District, since September 19, 2019. The menu includes laphet (fermented tea-leaf salad with sunflower seeds, sesame, and peanuts), samosas, and paratha served with paprika and turmeric-based curries. The restaurant is most known for the tea leaf salad.

Top Burmese Bistro Royale 

Top Burmese Bistro Royale opened in Beaverton in 2020 and has an "Indian-influenced" menu. Robots help serve food at the restaurant.

Top Burmese Burma Joy 

Top Burmese Burma Joy (or Burma Joy Noodle House) is located on 23rd Avenue in the Northwest District and has focused on Chinese-inspired noodles since 2021. The restaurant served Tea Leaf "Laphet" Dumplings during The Oregonian's annual Dumpling Week in 2022.

Top Burmese Ambassador 
Top Burmese Ambassador on Hillsboro Main Street was opened in 2022.

Old Asia Bistro & Tea House 
Top Burmese for the first time branches beyond Burmese cuisine with their new restaurant concept centered around tea. Old Asia Bistro & Tea House will feature assortment of loose leaf tea from various regions, paired with pan Asiatic dishes from Burma, Singapore, and Malaysia. Top Burmese's Old Asia is slated to open in Beaverton in 2023.

Reception 
Nick Woo included Top Burmese's Ametha Ohn Htamin in Eater Portland's 2019 list of 13 "stellar" curries in the city. The website's Waz Wu included the samusa thoke served by the original restaurant and Bistro Royale in a 2020 overview of "where to find satisfying vegan soups in Portland". Wu also included the restaurants in a 2021 list of Portland's "most comforting" vegan noodle soups", and a 2023 list of the city's "primo special occasion" restaurants for vegans and vegetarians.  Eater Portland has also included Top Burmese Bistro Royale in a list of 16 "exemplary" restaurants in Beaverton. The Oregonian included Top Burmese in a 2021 list of "Best New Portland Restaurants".

References

External links 

 
 

2019 establishments in Oregon
Asian restaurants in Portland, Oregon
Burmese American
Burmese cuisine
Northwest District, Portland, Oregon
Restaurants established in 2019
Restaurants in Beaverton, Oregon
Restaurants in Hillsboro, Oregon